Radio Cardiff (98.7 FM) is a community radio station serving Cardiff, the capital city of Wales. It broadcasts on a terrestrial frequency of 98.7 FM, via DAB in Cardiff and streams online via their website and TuneIn. The station was formerly called Beats FM.

The station was launched on 31 October 2007 by John Lenney M.B.E. It is the only community radio station in the city, and has a specific remit to broadcast music and features of interest to the Welsh Capital's diverse population.

The station's mission statement is "to deliver a diverse range of music with shows that break the mould of traditional radio".

Studios 
Radio Cardiff's main studio moved from the Meanwhile House to two containers outside the building, aiming at providing more accessible services to presenters and guests who have special needs. Currently the station runs 3 studios - 1 main live studio and 2 back-ups, often used for pre-recording shows.

News Service 
Hourly national updates as well as weekday sports, business and entertainment updates are provided by Radio News Hub. Radio Cardiff's news team present local news & weather bulletins Monday to Friday between 7:30am and 6:30pm.

Programming 
Radio Cardiff delivers programming intended to heighten cultural awareness and to spread information that is relevant to its target communities, and to offer listeners a wide variety of shows that demonstrate the station's commitment to provide a distinctive and local alternative to commercial and mainstream BBC output. Over 100 volunteers are regularly involved in creating content for the station, providing distinctive community-oriented programming which has an estimated weekly reach of 26,365.

The station showcases the rich cultural diversity of Cardiff, and provides training opportunities for members of its target audience. It broadcasts content that is popular and relevant to a local and specific audience which can often be overlooked, and it plays music that reflects the multi-cultural heritage of the city, which has one of the longest established BME communities in the UK. The cultural heritage of these communities is reflected in its station music policy, which features genres like soul, reggae, R&B and more.

As well as a wide variety of music, it produces talk-based shows cover a variety of different topics including: local history, current affairs, science among others.

Schedule
Radio Cardiff's schedule is a mix of music shows and news-based programmes.

Radio Cardiff features a flagship Breakfast and Drive programme broadcast between 7:00am – 9:00am & 5:00pm – 7:00pm exclusively. Host of the shows hosts include Kelly RB (Weekday Breakfast), and Connor Morgans (Weekend Breakfast).

Governance   
The operating licence for Radio Cardiff is held by Safer Wales.

Radio Cardiff is steered by a management committee made up of local people and broadcasters. The Head of Station now is Donna Zammit.

References

External links 
Official website

Radio stations in Cardiff
Community radio stations in the United Kingdom
Radio stations established in 2007
Urban adult contemporary radio stations
Jazz radio stations in the United Kingdom
Blues radio stations
Reggae, soca and calypso radio stations
2007 establishments in Wales